Lorenzo de Monteclaro (born September 5, 1939) is a singer of Regional Mexican music.  He was born with the name of Lorenzo Hernández in Cuencamé de Ceniceros, Durango, and sang for the first time on radio in the late 1950s on a Sunday talent contest called "Aficionados de los Ejidos" on XEDN (Torreón, Coahuila).  He has sung on more than 90 albums and acted in almost 50 films and continues singing even after 5 decades.  His youngest son, Ricardo de Monteclaro, is also the drummer, who plays in his father's band.

Awards

Discography (partial) 
Chaparrita Pelo Largo [?]
Ese Señor De Las Canas [?]
Grandes Éxitos del Ausente [?]

Los Mejores Corridos de Contrabando (1980)

Acompañado Por El Grupo De Rogelio Gutierrez (1981)

15 Auténticos Éxitos (1982)
Con Banda Sinaloense (1983)
Hipócrita (1984)

De Esta Sierra a la Otra Sierra (1985)

16 Grandes Éxitos (1986)

Corridos Famosos (1987)

Boleros de Siempre con Banda Sinaloense (1988)

Tesoros Musicales [CBS] (1988)

La de la Boca Chiquita [1989]

Solo Eres Tú (1989)

Canciones de Siempre con Lorenzo de Monteclaro y la Banda Los Escamilla (1991)

Persica (1991)

Tesoros Musicales [Sony] (1991)

De Monteclaro Reyes Avitia (1992)

Indiscutíblemente (1996)

Lorenzo De Monteclaro (1992)

Corridos con Banda (1992)

Personalidad (1992)

De Mil Amores (1993)

20 De Colección (1994)

Brillantes (1994)

Digan lo que Digan (1995)

Lorenzo de Monteclaro y Sus 15 Grandes Éxitos (1995)

Mexicanísimo: 20 Éxitos (1995)

Econo Series (1997)

Raíces de Música Norteña (1997)

Raíces de la Música Norteña (1998)

20 Éxitos (2000)

Mis Mejores Años (2000)

Sensación de Lorenzo de Monteclaro (2000)

Esto Es lo Mejor: 20 Exitos (2002)

30 Éxitos Insuperables (2003)

Mis 30 Mejores Canciones (2003)

Estrellas Y Relampagos (2005)

15 Éxitos (2006)

30 Éxitos De Siempre (2006)

Ausente (2006)

Ídolos de Siempre (2006)

Raíces de Nuestra Música (2006)

Cuando los Hijos se Van (2008)

El Amor No Se Vende (2008)

Filmography (partial)
Tierra Sa (1965)
Me caí de la nube (1974)
Los Tres compadres (1975)
Las tres tumbas (1979)
Tres Contra el Destino (1980
El Cara Parchada (1979)
El Perdón de La Hija de Nadie. (1978)
Dios Los cria (1977)

References

External links
 http://www.lorenzodemonteclaro.itgo.com/about.html [Spanish]

Ranchera singers
Living people
1939 births
20th-century Mexican male singers
21st-century Mexican male singers